W.A.K.O. European Championships 1977 were the first ever W.A.K.O. European kickboxing championships introduced by the pioneer of German Karate Georg Brueckner and the first ever event hosted by the W.A.K.O. organization – then known as the W.M.A.A. (World of Mixed Martial Arts Association) who itself had only just recently been founded in 1976.  There had actually been an amateur kickboxing European championships held a year previously but this event was not officially recognized by any  federation.  The W.A.K.O. championships were open to amateur men based in Europe only and all bouts were fought under Full-Contact kickboxing rules, with each country allowed more than one competitor in each weight category.  By the end of the championships the Netherlands were the most successful nation, with West Germany second, and Norway a distant third - more detail on the winners and medal tables can be found in the sections below.  The event was held in 1977 in Vienna, Austria.

Men's Full-Contact Kickboxing

The first European championships were sparse when compared with the present day version, hosting only one style – Full-Contact kickboxing – for men only.  In terms of weight categories there were seven weight divisions ranging from 57 kg/125.4 lbs to over 84 kg/+184.8 lbs.  More detail on Full-Contact's rules-set can be found at the W.A.K.O. website, although be aware that the rules have changed since 1977.  The medal winners of each division are shown below.

Men's Full-Contact Kickboxing Medals Table

Overall medals standing (top 5)
The Netherlands was the most dominant nation at the 1977 W.A.K.O. European Championships picking up four gold, two silver and three bronze medals.

See also
List of WAKO Amateur European Championships
List of WAKO Amateur World Championships

References

External links
 WAKO World Association of Kickboxing Organizations Official Site

WAKO Amateur European Championships events
Kickboxing in Austria
1977 in kickboxing
Sports competitions in Vienna
1970s in Vienna